The Ese is a river in the department of Corse-du-Sud, Corsica, France. It is a tributary of the Prunelli river, which it joins in the Lac de Tolla.

Course

It crosses the communes of Bastelica, Ciamannacce, Frasseto, Guitera-les-Bains, Tasso and Tolla.
It rises in the commune of Ciamannacce to the north of the  Monte Giovanni.
It passes a ski resort, the Val d'Ese, in its upper reaches.
It flows in a generally southwest direction, then turns west and joins the Prunelli at the head of Lac de Tolla.

In winter there is a downhill and cross-country ski resort here. 
If there is no snow, visitors can hike in the Pozzines.
Lower down, the Ese is crossed by the magnificent Zipitoli Genoese bridge near its confluence with the Prunelli.
The bridge is near the point where the D27 crosses the Ese, and can be reached by a short walk.

The Lac de Tolla is formed by a dam (Barrage de Tolla) on the Prunelli river.
The Ruisseau d'Agnone and the Ese River also empty into the lake.
It is in the commune of Tolla just south of the village of Tolla.

Tributaries
The following streams (ruisseaux) are tributaries of the Ese (ordered by length):

Calderanolla: 
Majalei: 
Catagna: 
Pisciancone: 
Bottaggio: 
Piscia: 
Biettajo: 
l'Imbuto: 
Revorgeto: 
Particacceto: 
Paratella: 
Chiova: 
Campolongo:

Notes

Citations

Sources

Rivers of Corse-du-Sud
Rivers of France
Coastal basins of the Mediterranean Sea in Corsica